Shoaib Hashmi is a veteran playwright, actor and professor from Pakistan.

Family life and education
Hashmi received his Master of Arts degree in economics from Government College (now Government College University), Lahore and his MSc. degree from London School of Economics (LSE), London He also studied theater at the Royal Academy of Dramatic Arts, London.

Hashmi is married to Salima Hashmi, the daughter of noted Pakistani poet, Faiz Ahmed Faiz. The couple have two children.

Career

Teaching
Hashmi taught economics for many years at Government College (now Government College University), Lahore and later taught Lahore School of Economics. For a while now, he has been sick and paralyzed. He has difficulty walking and talking. Shoaib is under treatment in Lahore. Besides his immediate family wishing him well, among his well-wishers is Arshad Mehmood (composer), an accomplished music composer and actor in Pakistan, who happens to be one of his fond students from 1969 - Shoaib's college-teaching-days in Lahore. Arshad Mehmood commented about Shoaib Hashmi in an interview to a major newspaper, "A man of few words, Hashmi is courteous, tolerant and compassionate. I often meet his friends and students and they all love him. He is basically an artist and a humanist. Poetry and music are his favourite topics of discussion."

Works

TV serials
He wrote the following comedy TV serials for Pakistan Television (PTV) which originally aired in the 1970s.
 Akkar Bakkar (1970s comedy show designed to educate children)
 Sach Gupp (1970s comedy show)
 Taal Matol (1970s comedy show)
 Balila - banned soon after it aired.

Newspaper column
 'Taal Matol' newspaper column in The News International newspaper on Sundays.

Awards
 Pride of Performance in 1995
 Tamgha-i-Imtiaz

References

Year of birth missing (living people)
Living people
Pakistani dramatists and playwrights
Recipients of the Pride of Performance
Recipients of Tamgha-e-Imtiaz
Academic staff of Lahore School of Economics
Government College University, Lahore alumni
Writers from Lahore
Alumni of the London School of Economics
Academic staff of the Government College University, Lahore
Alumni of RADA
St. Anthony's High School, Lahore alumni
Pakistani male television actors